Shilav Group is an Israeli company which operates a chain of toy stores in Israel, a line of developmental toys for babies, and a line of apparel for newborns, infants, and toddlers.

History
Shilav was founded by husband and wife Isaac and Shosi Oren. The name "Shilav" is a Hebrew acronym for "home delivery for new parents". The company was established in 1974 as a "one-stop-shopping" store for baby needs.

Shilav launched its Tiny Love line of developmental toys in 1993.

Tiny Love has competed successfully with giants of the toy industry such as Fisher Price.

References

External links 
 http://www.shilav.co.il/ (Shilav Group's official website)

Retail companies of Israel
Israeli brands
Toy companies of Israel